Pazhayannur  is a town and panchayath in Thrissur district, in the state of Kerala, India.

Demographics
 India census, Pazhayannur had a population of 15,979 with 7,680 males and 8,299 females. Historically, a major part of Pazhayannur was under the Brahmins, who came from Thanjavoor in Tamil Nadu. Pazhayannur is a place of religious harmony. From Pazhayannur, there are four major roads that point in different directions; towardsChelakkara, Alathur, Ottapalam, Thrissur. This makes Pazhayannur town an important junction to go to many nearby towns.There is a Higher Secondary School and a college run by the Institute of Human Resource Development (IHRD CAS Chelakkara) in this panchayath.The nearby railway stations are Lakkidi and Wadakkancherry.The nearest airport Is at Nedumbassery.

History
Pazhayannur – a small town located in Thrissur district & Chelakkara region of Kerala – is a place where religions dwell in harmony with each other. Earlier, a large part of this town was under the Brahmans who had come from Tanjavur (Tamil Nadu). At the centre of Pazhayannur is the Bhagavathy Temple that is presided by the main deity Pazhayannur Bhagavathy. It is believed that this deity was the family deity, paradevatha of the erstwhile Royal family of Cochin and was brought by the Maharaja of Cochin himself.

Pazhayannur Bhagavathy Temple is believed to be more than 500 years old. In those times this temple – known as Pallipurath Mahavishnu – was dedicated to Lord Vishnu.

Divine Mother entered this temple in Seventeenth Century and there are synopses to support this. The king of Kochi helped a great deal to develop this temple. And then it was named the Pazhayannur Bhagavathy Temple as it is called now. Both Divine Mother and Lord Vishnu are equally worshiped here in this temple. The premise has a Shiva temple too.

The offering of live roosters and feeding them as an act of worship is a ritual as believed by the worshippers. People believe that these are Divine Mother's favorite; hence, by this act their wishes will be fulfilled. People say that when in old times the temple and the area around it was under an attack, Divine Mother appeared in forms of thousands of roosters, assaulting the enemy soldiers with their piercing beaks, knife-like claws and high-pitched sharp sounds and won a victory over them. So, the belief is that the act offering live roosters to Ma & feeding them would burn the evil and destroy the enemies. Going back to that odd yet kindly and pleasant ritual – something that we don't see around. Many innocent animals and birds are sacrificed in the name of religion & a visit to such a place was indeed a joy, Adjoining to the Bhagavathy temple is the Siva temple.

Pazhayannur is considered a place of historical importance, and is seen in the map of "Nannangadis" of Kerala. Nannangadis are the tombs of people who lived in the medieval times and are usually depicted in the shape of large pots.

Festivals
Hundreds of devotees visit the Mahakshethram every year, and partake and participate both in person and contributions to carry out the various poojas and offerings to Her. Traditionally the temple celebrates Aarattu, Niramaala, 9 days of Navarathri vilakku which is sponsored in a large way by the local institutions including the Dept. of Police, Revenue etc. The nightly events include Classical music by famous musicians, Ottanthullal, Kathakali and Harikathakaalakshepam etc. Niramaala is one of the major celebrations that goes on every year in Pazhayannur.

Important Festivals "Ulsavam" and "Niramala". Ulsavam 8 days festival is held, which begins with Kodiyettam and ends with Aarattu on "Thiruvonam" in the month of Malayalam month Meenam and "Niramala is one day Festival. Navarathri also Celebrated in grand manner with traditional Keralite Arts.

The main sloka for Goddess Annapoorneshwari goes as below:

"Annapoorne sadapoorne sanakra pranavallabhe
Gnanavairagya siddhyaratham bikshamdeheecha paravathy
Matha cha Parvathee devyo pitha devo maheswaraha
Bandahvaschiva bakthyartham svadesobhuvanthrayam"

References

The famous song for Pazhayannur is posted on YouTube - https://www.youtube.com/watch?v=VscLS3_eMnk

Villages in Thrissur district